Dirty is a 2020 short LGBT coming-of-age romantic drama film, written and directed by Matthew Puccini. It premiered at the 2020 Sundance Film Festival, where it was nominated for the Grand Jury Prize for Best Short Film.

The film made its online premiere through a virtual screening by SXSW, as the festival was cancelled as a result of the COVID-19 pandemic. Nevertheless, the festival still awarded the film with a Special Jury Award for the performances of its lead actors, Morgan Sullivan and Manny Dunn. It then went on to play at BFI Flare, Outfest Fusion, Atlanta Film Festival and the Palm Springs International ShortFest; at the latter it was nominated for Best LGBTQ+ Short. In October 2020, the film's streaming rights were acquired by The Criterion Channel.

Premise
Marco cuts class to spend the afternoon with his boyfriend, Graham. Things do not go as planned.

According to Puccini, this film and his previous short, Lavender (2019), are personal to him, saying: "I’m grateful for both films for different reasons and they are all part of one period of my life — exploring these ideas of intimacy and loneliness and queer people seeking connection. In some ways they’re almost two attempts to answer the same question."

Cast
 Morgan Sullivan as Marco
 Manny Dunn as Graham
 Sean Patrick Higgins as Mr. Flanangan
 Ethan River Cohen, Chelsea Eason, Cherish Hearts, Ryan Knight, Octavia Kohner, Maurice Nelson, Zac Porter, Olivia Sulkowicz, Melissa Topnas, Arianna Wellmoney, Jude Young as Students

Accolades

Film festival awards

References

External links

Dirty at Matthew Puccini's website

2020 films
2020 romantic drama films
2020 short films
2020 LGBT-related films
LGBT-related coming-of-age films
Gay-related films
American drama short films
Films directed by Matthew Puccini
2020s English-language films
2020s American films